Tritonoharpa beui is a species of sea snail, a marine gastropod mollusk in the family Cancellariidae, the nutmeg snails.

References

 Verhecken, A. (1997). Mollusca, Gastropoda: Arafura Sea Cancellariidae collected during the KARUBAR Cruise. in: Crosnier, A. et al. (Ed.) Résultats des Campagnes MUSORSTOM 16. Campagne Franco-Indonésienne KARUBAR. Mémoires du Muséum national d'Histoire naturelle. Série A, Zoologie. 172: 295–324. 
 Ma Xiutong & Zhang Suping. (2000). Study on Colubrariidae from China seas,with descriptions of two new species. Studia Marina Sinica. 42: 146–152.
 Verhecken A. (2020). New and poorly known species of Cancellariidae (Neogastropoda: Cancellarioidea) from the Indian Ocean and the western Pacific. Gloria Maris. 59(2): 40–89.
 Verhecken A. (2011) The Cancellariidae of the Panglao Marine Biodiversity Project 2004 and the Panglao 2005 and Aurora 2007 deep sea cruises in the Philippines, with description of six new species (Neogastropoda, Cancellarioidea). Vita Malacologica 9: 1-60.

Cancellariidae
Gastropods described in 1997